The 2007 Italian motorcycle Grand Prix was the sixth round of the 2007 MotoGP championship. It took place on the weekend of 1–3 June 2007 at the Mugello Circuit.

MotoGP classification

250 cc classification

125 cc classification

Championship standings after the race (MotoGP)

Below are the standings for the top five riders and constructors after round six has concluded. 

Riders' Championship standings

Constructors' Championship standings

 Note: Only the top five positions are included for both sets of standings.

References

Italian motorcycle Grand Prix
Italian
Motorcycle Grand Prix